Edele Claire Christina Edwina Lynch (born 15 December 1979) is an Irish singer, songwriter, and television personality. She is the lead singer of the Irish girl group B*Witched, of which her twin sister Keavy is also a member. In 2013, Lynch won Celebrity Apprentice Ireland, and the following year she appeared in the fourteenth series of Celebrity Big Brother.

Career

B*Witched and Barbarellas
In 1997, Edele and her twin sister Keavy formed the girl group Butterfly Farm with their friend Sinéad O'Carroll. The trio began writing and recording together, but soon realised that there was "someone missing". Upon Keavy's suggestion, they asked Armaou to come for an audition and she played a tape recording of a song she had written. The other girls liked it and Lindsay became the fourth member of the group, who later changed their name to B*Witched.

After the split, Edele joined for the songwriting/production team Xenomania. She co-wrote "Some Kind of Miracle" for Girls Aloud's debut album Sound of the Underground, and "Buster", "Situation's Heavy" and "Twisted" for the Sugababes' third album Three. In 2006, Edele and Keavy created a duo group going by the name of Ms Lynch, until December 2009 when they were officially rebranded as "Barbarellas". Edele confirmed on Facebook in late 2012 that the Barbarellas project had come to an end before reuniting with B*Witched.

Celebrity Apprentice and Celebrity Big Brother
On 28 October 2013, Edele won Celebrity Apprentice Ireland, beating journalist Amanda Brunker in the final and winning €25,000 for her chosen charity, Laura Lynn House.

On 18 August 2014, Edele became the ninth housemate to enter the Celebrity Big Brother house.
Edele later finished 6th in Celebrity Big Brother 2014.

References

External links
 

1979 births
Irish women singers
Irish pop singers
Living people
People from Donaghmede
Irish twins
Xenomania
British women record producers
B*Witched members
Twin musicians